Vahidabad (also Romanized as Vaḩīdābād) is a village in Borj-e Akram Rural District, in the Central District of Fahraj County, Kerman Province, Iran. At the 2006 census, its population was 141, in 41 families.

References 

Populated places in Fahraj County